The Northrop HL-10 was one of five US heavyweight lifting body designs flown at NASA's Flight Research Center (FRC—later Dryden Flight Research Center) in Edwards, California, from July 1966 to November 1975 to study and validate the concept of safely maneuvering and landing a low lift-over-drag vehicle designed for reentry from space. It was a NASA design and was built to evaluate "inverted airfoil" lifting body and delta planform. It currently is on display at the entrance to the Armstrong Flight Research Center at Edwards Air Force Base.

Development
Northrop Corporation built the HL-10 and Northrop M2-F2, the first two of the fleet of "heavy" lifting bodies flown by the NASA Flight Research Center. The contract for construction of the HL-10 and the M2-F2 was $1.8 million. "HL" stands for horizontal landing, and "10" refers to the tenth design studied by engineers at NASA's Langley Research Center, Hampton, Virginia. Main gear was a modified T-38 system retracted manually, and lowered by nitrogen pressure. Nose gear was a modified T-39 unit, retracted manually and lowered with nitrogen pressure. Pilot Ejection System was a modified F-106 system. Silver zinc batteries provided electrical power for the control system, flight instruments, radios, cockpit heat, and stability augmentation system. To assist in pre-landing flare, four throttleable hydrogen peroxide rockets provided up to 400 lbf (1.8 kN) of thrust.

Operational history

After delivery to NASA in January 1966, the HL-10 made its first flight on December 22, 1966, with research pilot Bruce Peterson in the cockpit. Although the XLR-11 rocket engine (same type used in the Bell X-1) was installed, the first 11 drops from the B-52 launch aircraft were unpowered glide flights to assess handling qualities, stability, and control. In the end, the HL-10 was judged to be the best handling of the three original heavy-weight lifting bodies (M2-F2/F3, HL-10, X-24A).

The HL-10 was flown 37 times during the lifting body research program and logged the highest altitude and fastest speed in the lifting body program. On February 18, 1970, Air Force test pilot Peter Hoag piloted the HL-10 to Mach 1.86.

Moments after being dropped, the XLR-11 was lit by the pilot. Speed and altitude increased until the engine was shut down by choice or fuel exhaustion, depending upon the individual mission profile.

Following engine shutdown, the pilot maneuvered the vehicle through a simulated return-from-space corridor into a pre-planned approach for a landing on one of the lakebed runways on Rogers Dry Lake at Edwards. A circular approach was used to lose altitude during the landing phase. On the final approach leg, the pilot increased his rate of descent to build up energy.

Unusual and valuable lessons were learned through the successful flight testing of the HL-10. During the early phases of the Space Shuttle development program, lifting bodies patterned on the HL-10 shape were one of three major types of proposals. These were later rejected as it proved difficult to fit cylindrical fuel tanks into the always-curving fuselage, and from then on most designs focused on more conventional delta wing craft.

HL-10 pilots
John A. Manke — 10 flights, 7 powered flights
William H. Dana — 9 flights, 8 powered flights
Jerauld R. Gentry — 9 flights, 2 powered flights
Peter C. Hoag —  8 flights, 7 powered flights
Bruce Peterson — 1 flight, 0 powered flights

Unrealized space flight
According to the book "Wingless Flight", by project engineer R. Dale Reed, the HL-10 was considered to fly into space in the early to mid-1970s. Following the cancellation of the Apollo moon project, Reed realized that there would be substantial Apollo hardware left over, including several flight-rated command service modules (CSM) and Saturn V rockets.

The proposal was to add an ablative heat shield, reaction controls, and other additional subsystems needed for crewed spaceflight to the HL-10. The now space-rated vehicle would have then been launched in the space for the Lunar Module on a Saturn V launch vehicle with an Apollo CSM. Once in Earth orbit, it was planned that a robotic extraction arm would remove the HL-10 from the rocket's third stage and place it adjacent to the crewed Apollo CSM spacecraft. One of the astronauts would then spacewalk from the Apollo and board the lifting body to perform a pre-reentry check on its systems.

It was planned that there would be two flights in this program. In the first, the lifting body pilot would return to the Apollo and send the HL-10 back to earth uncrewed. If this flight was successful, the second launch would be involve a piloted landing at Edwards AFB. Reportedly, Wernher von Braun was enthusiastic about the mission, offering to prepare two Saturn Vs and Apollo Command Service Modules. However, he was overridden by the  Flight Research Center director, and nothing came of the proposal. Launching a Saturn V to low Earth orbit with a light payload would not be an efficient use of capability, and the Apollo program was ended mainly on cost grounds.

HL-10 flights

Aircraft serial number
Northrop HL-10 — NASA 804, 37 flights

Status
The HL-10 is currently on display at the entrance of Armstrong Flight Research Center at Edwards, CA.

Specifications (Northrop HL-10)

General characteristics
 Crew: one pilot
 Length: 21 ft 2 in (6.45 m)
 Wingspan: 13 ft 7 in (4.15 m)
 Height: 9 ft 7 in (2.92 m)
 Wing area: 160 ft2 (14.9 m2)
 Empty: 5,285 lb (2,397 kg)
 Loaded: 6,000 lb (2,721 kg)
 Maximum takeoff: 10,009 lb (4,540 kg) (propellant wt 3,536 lb - 1,604 kg)
 Powerplant: 1 x Reaction Motors XLR-11 four-chamber rocket engine. 8,000 lbf (35.7 kN) thrust

Performance
 Maximum speed: 1,228 mph (1,976 km/h)
 Range: 45 miles (72 km)
 Service ceiling: 90,303 ft (27,524 m)
 Rate of climb:  ft/min ( m/min)
 Wing loading: 62.5 lb/ft2 (304.7 kg/m2)
 Thrust-to-weight: 1:0.99

Fictional references
In the pilot movie, and an episode of The Six Million Dollar Man series, titled "The Deadly Replay", the HL-10 serial number 804 is identified as the aircraft flown by Col. Steve Austin when he crashed, leading to his transformation into a bionic man, and the HL-10 is also featured in this episode. Other episodes and Martin Caidin's original novel, Cyborg, contradict this, however, by identifying Austin's aircraft as a fictional cousin of the HL-10, the M3-F5. Further confusion is added by the fact that both the HL-10 and the M2-F2 are featured in the opening credits of the television show.

See also

References

 NASA Dryden HL-10 Photo Collection
 Developing and Flight Testing the HL-10 Lifting Body - NASA 1994 (PDF)
 Current display location

Lifting bodies
1960s United States experimental aircraft
HL-10, Northrop
HL-10, Northrop
HL-10
Aircraft first flown in 1966